Hu Qiaomu (4 June 191228 September 1992) was a Chinese sociologist, Marxist philosopher and politician.

Hu Qiaomu is a controversial figure for opposing the reform and opening up era of economic reform that followed the death of Mao Zedong. He was a member of Politburo of the Chinese Communist Party, permanent member of Central Advisory Commission, and the former president of Xinhua News Agency. He was an academician of Chinese Academy of Sciences.

Early career
Born in Yancheng, Jiangsu Province in 1912, Hu graduated from the Department of Foreign Literature, College of Arts and Sciences, National Chekiang University in 1935. Before this, he also studied history in Tsinghua University (in Beijing) during 1930–1932.

Hu was an early member of the Chinese Communist Party (CCP), joining the Communist Youth League of China in 1930 and the CCP in 1932. In the early part of his career, he was, in chronological order, the party secretary (Communist Youth League of China) in Xijiao District, Beiping City (now Beijing); the head of the Propaganda Department (Communist Youth League of China) in Xijiao District, Beiping City. He was a leader of anti-Japanese student and worker movement in Beiping. In 1936, he became the general secretary of Chinese Sociologist League, the general secretary of Chinese Leftism Cultural League, and a member of CCP Jiangsu Province Temporary Committee of Labours.

From February 1941 (some say 1942) to June 1966, he was Mao Zedong's main secretary. In the beginning, his secretarial work was mainly focused on culture, but later shifted to politics. His secretarial career was ended by the Cultural Revolution.

From October 1, 1949, to October 19, 1949, he was the president of Xinhua News Agency. He also was the head of the News Office of the People's Republic of China; the vice president of Propaganda Department of the Chinese Communist Party; the general secretary of the Central Government Culture and Education Committee; the vice general secretary of the Central Government. In 1954, he also participated in making the Constitution of the People's Republic of China. In 1956, Hu was elected to be a member of the Eighth Politburo of the CCP, and the alternative secretary of Secretariat of the Chinese Communist Party. In 1977, he became the first president of Chinese Academy of Social Sciences and later on, advisor and the honorary president.

In 1951 Hu wrote "Thirty Years of the Chinese Communist Party". The book emphasised the Mao Zedong's ideological importance, writing that only he was able to correctly interpret and apply Marxism–Leninism to the Chinese situation. It also gave praise and recognition to orthodox Marxism, Joseph Stalin, the Comintern and the Soviet Union, acknowledging their role in the revolution and the formation of the Chinese Communist Party.

Subsequent career and intellectual contributions 
Hu was persecuted during the Cultural Revolution and rehabilitated in the 1970s. After his rehabilitation, Hu was involved in developing a new historiographical model for the CCP. Those contributions included an important role in party discussions on how to address the Cultural Revolution and a central role in preparing the 1981 "Resolution on Certain Questions in Our Party's History."

Hu was instrumental in promoting the Second Sino-Japanese War as an academic subject. He successfully led a national-level campaign to open the War of Resistance Museum. In the 1980s, Hu advocated a view of history more accepting of incorporating the Nationalists' contributions during the war. His history of dedication to the party and long-time focus on historiography gave further weight to this approach.

References

Further reading 

 "The Politics of China: The Eras of Mao and Deng" Edited by Roderick MacFarquhar, published by Cambridge University Press, 1997.
 Two Pens of CPC - Hu Qiaomu & Zhou Yang 
 Notes from People's Daily

1912 births
1992 deaths
Zhejiang University alumni
Chinese sociologists
People's Republic of China politicians from Jiangsu
Republic of China philosophers
Members of the Chinese Academy of Sciences
Writers from Yancheng
Chinese Communist Party politicians from Jiangsu
Scientists from Yancheng
People's Republic of China philosophers
Philosophers from Jiangsu
Politicians from Yancheng
Members of the 12th Politburo of the Chinese Communist Party
People's Daily people
Secretaries to Mao Zedong